The 1937 Saint Louis Billikens football team was an American football team that represented Saint Louis University as a member of the Missouri Valley Conference (MVC) during the 1937 college football season. In its fourth season under head coach Cecil Muellerleile, the team compiled a 7–2–1 record (2–1 against MVC opponents) and outscored opponents by a total of 140 to 62. The team played its home games at Walsh Stadium in St. Louis.

Schedule

References

Saint Louis
Saint Louis Billikens football seasons
Saint Louis Billikens football